Albayrak is a Turkish surname. Notable people with the surname include:

 Berat Albayrak, Turkish businessman
 Erhan Albayrak, Turkish footballer
 Eren Albayrak, Turkish footballer
 Hakan Albayrak, Turkish journalist
 Mikail Albayrak, Turkish footballer
 Nebahat Albayrak, Turkish-Dutch politician
 Sinan Albayrak, Turkish actor
 Tayfun Rıdvan Albayrak, Turkish footballer
 Tuğçe Albayrak (1991–2014), German-Turkish victim of violence, see Death of Tuğçe Albayrak
 Uğur Albayrak, Turkish footballer

See also
 Albayrak, Çüngüş

Turkish-language surnames